Dimorphotheca sinuata, the glandular Cape marigold, Namaqualand daisy, or orange Namaqualand daisy; syn. Dimorphotheca aurantiaca hort.) is a species of plants native to southern Africa. It is also widely cultivated as an ornamental and naturalized in parts of the United States, primarily California and Arizona.

Dimorphotheca sinuata grows in western South Africa and in Namibia, very often in places receiving winter rainfall but also in sandy deserts. It flowers early in spring. It is an annual sometimes exceeding 30 cm (12 inches) in height. Flower heads are generally yellow or orange with purple markings, containing both ray florets and disc florets.

See also
 Namaqualand Daisies, South Africa field hockey

References

External links
Jepson Manual Treatment

sinuata
Flora of Southern Africa
Garden plants of Southern Africa
Plants described in 1838
Taxa named by Augustin Pyramus de Candolle